Attorney General Franklin may refer to:

Thomas E. Franklin (lawyer) (1810–1884), Attorney General of Pennsylvania
Walter Franklin (judge) (1773–1836), Attorney General of Pennsylvania

See also
General Franklin (disambiguation)